is the main railway station for the city of Beppu in Ōita Prefecture, Japan, which is famous for its onsen. It is situated on the Nippō Main Line. The station, and all trains serving it, are operated by JR Kyūshū.

Limited Express Trains
 Sonic ( - )
 Nichirin (Hakata - )
 Yufuin-no-mori, Yufu (Hakata - Beppu)
 Trans-Kyushu Limited Express (Beppu - )

Layout
Beppu Station has two side platforms and four island platforms.

Adjacent stations

History
The Kyushu Railway was nationalised on 1 July 1907. Japanese Government Railways (JGR), designated the track as the Hōshū Main Line on 12 October 1909 and expanded it southwards in phases, with Beppu opening as the new southern terminus on 16 July 1911. On 15 December 1923, the Hōshū Main Line was renamed the Nippō Main Line. With the privatization of Japanese National Railways (JNR), the successor of JGR, on 1 April 1987, the station came under the control of JR Kyushu.

Passenger statistics
In fiscal 2016, the station was used by an average of 5,933 passengers daily (boarding passengers only), and it ranked 31st among the busiest stations of JR Kyushu.

References

External links

  

Railway stations in Ōita Prefecture
Stations of Kyushu Railway Company
Railway stations in Japan opened in 1911
Beppu, Ōita